Israel competed at the 2007 Summer Universiade also known as the XXIV Summer Universiade, in Bangkok, Thailand.

Medals

Medals by sport

Basketball

Men's competition
Preliminary round (group stage)

Second Phase (Classification)

Fencing

Women's

References

Summer Universiade
Nations at the 2007 Summer Universiade
Israel at the Summer Universiade